Oleg Valerianovich Basilashvili (born 26 September 1934) is a Soviet and Russian stage and film actor. People's Artist of the USSR (1984).

Biography

Childhood
He was born to a family of mixed Russian, Polish, and Georgian origin. He is half Russian.

Oleg Valerianovich Basilashvili was born on 26 September 1934 in Moscow, Russian SFSR, Soviet Union. His father, named Valerian Basilashvili, was a director of the Moscow Polytechnical College. His mother, named Irina Ilyinskaya, was a teacher of linguistics.

His father made up a humorous story that his grandfather had once arrested a dangerous criminal named Dzhugashvili, who was really Joseph Stalin. In reality Basilashvili's maternal grandfather was a Russian Orthodox priest and an architect, who participated in the construction of the Cathedral of Christ the Saviour in Moscow. During the World War II, young Oleg Basilashvili was evacuated from Moscow to the Transcaucasian republic of Georgia. There he went to a primary school and lived with his paternal grandfather until the end of World War II.

Acting career

In 1956, Oleg Basilashvili graduated from the Acting School of the Moscow Art Theatre, where he had studied under Pavel Massalsky. His group had many actors who would achieve fame in the future: among his fellows were Yevgeny Yevstigneyev, Mikhail Kozakov and Tatiana Doronina, his first wife. Together with Doronina, Basilashvili joined the troupe at the Bolshoi Drama Theater (BDT) in Leningrad under the leadership of the legendary director Georgy Tovstonogov. Since 1959 Basilashvili has been a permanent member of the troupe at the BDT in St. Petersburg. There his stage partners were such stars as Kirill Lavrov, Tatiana Doronina, Alisa Freindlich, Lyudmila Makarova, Svetlana Kryuchkova, Zinaida Sharko, Valentina Kovel, Innokenty Smoktunovsky, Oleg Borisov, Pavel Luspekayev, Sergei Yursky, and many other remarkable Russian actors. Basilashvili's most memorable stage works were in the play Uncle Vanya by Anton Chekhov, Kholstomer based on the eponymous story of Leo Tolstoy, The Lower Depths by Maxim Gorky, and other classic plays directed by Tovstonogov.

Film career

Oleg Basilashvili shot to fame with his roles in films by director Eldar Ryazanov. They collaborated in such popular films as Office Romance (1977), Station for Two (1982), Promised Heaven (1991), and Prediction (1993), which became significant box-office hits. Among Basilashvili's film partners were such actors as Alisa Freindlich, Lyudmila Gurchenko, Nikita Mikhalkov, Nonna Mordyukova, Yevgeny Leonov, and Natalya Gundareva, among many other Soviet/Russian film actors.

His most acclaimed film role was made in collaboration with director Georgiy Daneliya in the remarkable Autumn Marathon (1979). The film is a cross-genre comedy and melodrama with a bitter humor and satire of the Soviet life. In it Basilashvili plays a man in his mid-life crisis, who is torn between two nice women, his wife and his mistress, and all three of them become entangled in the game of lies and personal demands, being at the same time strangled by the stagnant Soviet reality. Basilashvili co-created a memorable acting ensemble with such actors, as Natalya Gundareva, Yevgeny Leonov, Marina Neyolova, and Nikolai Kryuchkov. The film became a Soviet classic, and was awarded at International film festivals in Berlin and San Sebastián.

In the 1980s he appeared in eccentric films by Karen Shakhnazarov. Those were Kurer (Courier) (1987), Gorod Zero (Zero City) (1988), and Sny (Dreams) (1993). Dreams, a wild comedy about Perestroika is especially remarkable: in it Basilashvili tried on several images, those of a noble count from the past, a pornographer and a rock star.

In 2001, Oleg Basilashvili starred in Karen Shakhnazarov's comedy Poisons or the World History of Poisoning (2001). The actor performed both as pensioner Prokhorov and the Pope Alexander VI Borgia in it.

Among the actor's other works of the early 21st century one can mention the role of Prof. Fyodorov in the historical film The Romanovs: An Imperial Family (2000) and General Yepanchin in the TV series The Idiot (2003) directed by Vladimir Bortko after the famous novel by Fyodor Dostoevsky.

Political career

During the 1990s he was a visible political figure in Russia, and was elected the representative of Leningrad (Saint Petersburg) in 1990. Eventually he became a member of the pro-democratic group of representatives in the Russian Parliament, and a supporter of such politicians as Anatoly Sobchak and the first President of Russia Boris Yeltsin. He was a strong proponent of returning the original name to the city of Saint Petersburg. He quit politics after 2000, and focused on his acting career.

He condemned the annexation of Crimea in 2014, and signed a public letter condemning the 2022 Russian invasion of Ukraine in support of Ukraine.

Comeback

After a few years of his artistic hiatus, Oleg Basilashvili made a comeback with an impressive performance as Woland in the TV miniseries The Master and Margarita (2005), an adaptation of the eponymous novel of Mikhail Bulgakov by director Vladimir Bortko. In his own words, Basilashvili played the character of Woland in resemblance of an authoritarian and manipulative bureaucrat, alluding to a Soviet-era dictator. Basilashvili created a powerful interplay with a stellar ensemble of actors, such as Aleksandr Abdulov, Kirill Lavrov, Anna Kovalchuk, Aleksandr Galibin, Aleksandr Filippenko, and other notable Russian actors.

Selected filmography 
 The Foundling (Подкидыш) as boy on the bike (1940)
 The Bride (Невеста) as Andrey Andreevich (1956)
 The Hot Soul (Горячая Душа) as Strelnikov (1959)
 The Garnet Bracelet (Гранатовый Браслет) as Vasily Lvovich (1964)
 Conspiracy of Ambassadors (Заговор Послов) as Robert Lockhart, head of the British mission (1965)
 Older Sister (Старшая Сестра) as Oleg Medynsky (1966)
 The Seventh Companion (Седьмой спутник) as arrested officer (1967)
 The Living Corpse (Живой Труп) as Viktor Mikhailovich Karenin (1968)
 Incredible Yehudiel Chlamyda (Невероятный Иегудиил Хламида) as Kosterin (1969)
 The Ballad of Bering and His Friends (Баллада о Беринге и Его Друзьях) as Ivan Alekseevich Dolgorukov, Prince (1970)
 The Return of Saint Luke (Возвращение «Святого Луки») as Yuri Konstantinovich Loskutov, engineer, antiques speculator (1970)
 Eternal Call (Вечный зов) as Arnold Lakhnovsky (1973-1983)
 Day of Admittance on Personal Matters (День Приёма по Личным Вопросам) as Dyatlov (1974)
 Did You Call the Doctor? (Врача вызывали?) as Pyotr Ivanovich, head physician of polyclinic No. 8 (1974)
 Take Aim (Выбор цели) as Boris Pash (1974)
 Balloonist (Воздухоплаватель) as Dmitry Timofeevich Ptashnikov (1975)
 A Slave of Love (Раба любви) as Savva Yakovlevich Yuzhakov, film producer (1976)
 Always with me... (Всегда со мною…) as Vasily Antonovich Rubtsov (1976)
 The Days of the Turbins (Дни Турбиных) as Vladimir Talberg (1976)
 The Life and Death of Ferdinand Luce (Жизнь и Смерть Фердинанда Люса) as Jürgen Kreutzman (1976)
 Funny People! (Смешные Люди!) as Fedor Akimovich, investigator (1977)
 Office Romance (Служебный роман) as Yuri Grigorievich Samokhvalov, deputy director of a statistical institution (1977)
 Colonel Chabert (Полковник Шабер) as Derville, lawyer (1978)
 Robbery at the Midnight (Ограбление в Полночь) as "Chief" (1978)
 There are no Special Signs (Особых Примет Нет) as Nikolaev (1978)
 Autumn Marathon (Осенний марафон) as Andrey Buzykin (1979)
 Say a Word for the Poor Hussar (...О бедном гусаре замолвите слово) as count Merzlyaev (1981)
 Station for Two (Вокзал для двоих) as Platon Ryabinin (1982)
 Together with Dunaevsky (Вместе с Дунаевским) (1984)
 And then Came Bumbo... (И вот Пришёл Бумбо…) as Ilya Mitrofanovich, father of Sashenka (1984)
 Complicity in Murder (Соучастие в Убийстве) as Thomas Hobson, Beth Tyson's wealthy lover (1985)
 Confrontation (Противостояние) as police colonel, criminal investigation officer, Vladislav Nikolaevich Kostenko (1985)
 Uncle Vanya. Scenes From Village Life (Дядя Ваня. Сцены из Деревенской Жизни) as Ivan Petrovich Voynitsky (1986)
 Face to Face (Лицом к Лицу) as Gadilin (1986)
 Courier (Курьер) as writer Semyon Kuznetsov, Katya's father (1986)
 End of the World Followed by Symposium (Конец Света с Последующим Симпозиумом) as Stanley Barrett (1987)
 The Great Game (Большая Игра) as Brenner (1988)
 Zerograd (Город Зеро) as writer Vasily Chugunov (1988)
 Chernov/Chernov (Чернов/Chernov) as Vsevolod Yarmak (1990)
 The Case (Дело) as Kandid Kastorovich Tarelkin (1991)
 Promised Heaven (Небеса обетованные) as Fedor Stepanovich Yelistratov, Fima’s brother (1991)
 Ticket to the Red Theater, or Death of a Gravedigger (Билет в Красный Театр, или Смерть Гробокопателя) as Police Lieutenant Colonel Kuznetsov (1992)
 Prediction (Предсказание) as writer Oleg Vladimirovich Goryunov (1993)
 Dreams (Сны) as Count Dmitry Prizorov (1993)
 Heads and Tails (Орёл и решка) as Professor Valentin Petrovich Savitsky (1995)
 Judge in the Trap (Судья в Ловушке) as Squizem (1998)
 What the Dead Man Said (Что Сказал Покойник) as mafia chief (1999)
 Gangster Petersburg 2 (Бандитский Петербург 2) as Lawyer, Nikolai Stepanovich Prokhorenko, prosecutor of St. Petersburg (episodes 1, 6-8) (2000)
 The Romanovs: An Imperial Family (Романовы. Венценосная семья) as professor Sergey Fedorov (2000)
 Poisons or the World History of Poisoning (Яды, или Всемирная история отравлений) as Prokhorov/Pope Alexander VI (2001)
 Under the Roofs of a Big City (Под Крышами Большого Города) as Dimov (2002)
 Azazel (Азазель) as general Lavrenty Mizinov (2003)
 The Idiot (Идиот) as general Ivan Yepanchin (2003)
 Dear Masha Berezina (Дорогая Маша Березина) as Gennady Norstein (2004)
 The Master and Margarita (Мастер и Маргарита) as Woland (2005)
 Leningradets (Ленинградец) as Nikolai Savitsky (2005)
 Sonya with Golden Hands (Сонька — Золотая Ручка) as Levit Sandanovich (2006)
 Liquidation (Ликвидация) as esoteric Igor Semenovich (2007)
 Don't Think About White Monkeys (Не Думай про Белых Обезьян) as one of the Authors (2008)
 Marevo (Марево) as Afanasy Ivanovich Tovstogub (2008)
 Off the Hook (Взятки Гладки) as Mr. Vyshnevsky (2008)
 Palm Sunday (Вербное Воскресенье) as Gennady Matveyevich Nikitin, Arthur's grandfather, member of the Politburo of the CPSU Central Committee (2009)
 The New Adventures of Aladdin (Новые Приключения Аладдина) as Narrator (2011)
 The Farmer (Хуторянин) as Pavel Ignatievich Sukhomlinov, owner (2013) 
 Without Borders (Без границ) (2015) as George
 Didn't Expect (Не Ждали) as Innokenty Mikhailovich, musician (2019)

Awards and honors 
 Order of the Red Banner of Labour (1979)
 Order "For Merit to the Fatherland":
2nd class (28 October 2019)
3rd class (5 February 2009) - for outstanding contribution to the development of domestic theatrical art and many years of fruitful activity
4th class (13 February 2004) - for outstanding contribution to the development of domestic theatrical art'
 Order of Friendship (17 December 1994) - for services to the people associated with the development of Russian statehood, the achievements in labor, science, culture, arts, strengthening friendship and cooperation between nations
 Honored Artist of the RSFSR (1969)
 People's Artist of the RSFSR (1977)
 People's Artist of the USSR (1984)
 Vasilyev Brothers State Prize of the RSFSR (1979) - for his role as Samokhvalov in the movie Office Romance
 Prize of the Government of St. Petersburg in the field of literature, art and architecture
    Gold Soffit Award for Best Actor (1997)
 Golden Mask Award for Best Actor (2009) - the role of Prince K. in the play "Uncle's Dream"
 International Theatre Prize in 2009 in the category "for his contribution to Russian theatre"
 Honorary Member of Russian Academy of Arts
 Presidential Order of Light (2010, Georgia)
 Order of Honour (2014)

References

External links
 
 Biography of Oleg Basilashvili
   Biography and filmography of Oleg Basilashvili on Peoples.ru

1934 births
20th-century Russian male actors
21st-century Russian male actors
Living people
Male actors from Moscow
Academicians of the National Academy of Motion Picture Arts and Sciences of Russia
Academicians of the Russian Academy of Cinema Arts and Sciences "Nika"
Honorary Members of the Russian Academy of Arts
Moscow Art Theatre School alumni
Honored Artists of the RSFSR
People's Artists of the RSFSR
People's Artists of the USSR
Recipients of the Nika Award
Recipients of the Order "For Merit to the Fatherland", 2nd class
Recipients of the Order "For Merit to the Fatherland", 3rd class
Recipients of the Order "For Merit to the Fatherland", 4th class
Recipients of the Order of Honour (Russia)
Recipients of the Order of the Red Banner of Labour
Recipients of the Presidential Order of Excellence
Recipients of the Vasilyev Brothers State Prize of the RSFSR
Russian people of Georgian descent
Russian actor-politicians
Russian male film actors
Russian male stage actors
Russian male television actors
Russian male voice actors
Soviet male film actors
Soviet male stage actors
Soviet male television actors
Soviet male voice actors
Russian activists against the 2022 Russian invasion of Ukraine
Union of Right Forces politicians